The 1995 Bucknell Bison football team was an American football team that represented Bucknell University during the 1995 NCAA Division I-AA football season. Bucknell finished second in the Patriot League.

In their first year under head coach Tom Gadd, the Bison compiled a 7–4 record. Rob Bird, Brian Gay and John Sakowski were the team captains.

The Bison outscored opponents 195 to 174. Bucknell's 4–1 conference record placed second in the six-team Patriot League standings.

Bucknell played its home games at Christy Mathewson–Memorial Stadium on the university campus in Lewisburg, Pennsylvania.

Schedule

References

Bucknell
Bucknell Bison football seasons
Bucknell Bison football